Robert Stephen "Steve" Beecroft (born 1957) is an American diplomat and attorney. He served as United States Ambassador to Egypt from December 2014 to June 2017. He previously served as United States Ambassador to Iraq and United States Ambassador to Jordan.

Education
Beecroft earned a B.A. from Brigham Young University and a J.D. from the University of California, Berkeley. A member of the Church of Jesus Christ of Latter-day Saints, he was a Mormon missionary in Venezuela.

Career 
After graduating from law school, Beecroft practiced law in the San Francisco office of an international law firm.

He joined the United States Foreign Service in 1994. He carried out an assignment in Washington, D.C. as Executive Assistant to two Secretaries of State Colin Powell and Condoleezza Rice, and Special Assistant to the Deputy Secretary of State. He also held assignments in the Department of State's Executive Secretariat and its Bureau of Near Eastern Affairs. Overseas he has served at the U.S. embassies in Amman, Riyadh, and Damascus. He served as Ambassador to the Hashemite Kingdom of Jordan from August 2008 until June 2011.

He joined the U.S. embassy in Baghdad, Iraq, as Deputy Chief of Mission on July 14, 2011. He became Charge d'Affaires upon the departure of Ambassador James Franklin Jeffrey on June 1, 2012. On September 11, 2012, the White House Press Office announced that President Barack Obama had nominated Beecroft to the U.S. Senate to succeed Jeffrey as the United States Ambassador to Iraq in the wake of the withdrawal of the nomination of Brett McGurk. He was confirmed by the Senate on September 22 and sworn in on October 9, 2012.

He is a recipient of the Department of State's Meritorious, Superior, and Distinguished Honor Awards and in April 2011 received the Diplomacy in Human Rights award.

U.S. Ambassador to Egypt 

Beecroft's nomination came shortly after the 2013 Egyptian coup d'état. At the time, U.S. officials had repeatedly criticized the army-backed interim Egyptian government in dealing violently with opponents, especially those associated with the Muslim Brotherhood - banned after the military coup - and for allowing the courts to issue death sentences on hundreds of opponents. It was expected that the Obama administration would nominate Robert Ford, who was a senior U.S. diplomat in the Syrian crisis to the post of ambassador in Cairo, but U.S. officials said that the Egyptian government had indicated that they saw Ford as close to Islamic parties in the Middle East.

In late-April 2014, the United States decided to lift the partial ban imposed on the military aid to Egypt - after the military coup - and the Pentagon delivered ten Apache helicopters to Egypt, and that followed the Egyptian Foreign Minister Nabil Fahmy visit to Washington.

On the same day Beecroft was nominated (May 9, 2014), the former Israeli Prime Minister Ehud Barak called on the United States to support the presidential candidate Abdel Fattah al-Sisi in Egypt, the Field Marshal leader of the coup d'état, during the elections and not to criticize him openly, and to postpone any differences with him until after he took office. Barak said in the 2014 speech to the Washington Institute for Near East Policy that "The United States must sometimes waive defending the values of freedom and democracy to protect its interests." He added that he felt happy after the intervention of the army and the arrest of deposed President Mohamed Morsi and setting the ousted President Hosni Mubarak freed from prison.

The U.S. Senate confirmed Beecroft to the post on June 26, 2014.

References

External links

|-

|-

1957 births
Living people
Ambassadors of the United States to Egypt
Ambassadors of the United States to Iraq
Ambassadors of the United States to Jordan
Latter Day Saints from California
American lawyers
American Mormon missionaries in Venezuela
Brigham Young University alumni
UC Berkeley School of Law alumni
20th-century Mormon missionaries
United States Foreign Service personnel